Jeter is a surname. Notable people with this surname include:

Sports

Baseball
 Derek Jeter (born 1974), American baseball player
 Johnny Jeter (baseball) (born 1944), American baseball player
 Shawn Jeter (born 1966), American baseball player

Basketball
 Eugene Jeter (born 1983), American basketball player
 Hal Jeter (born 1945), American basketball player
 Rob Jeter (born 1969), American basketball coach, son of Bob Jeter

American football
 Bob Jeter (1937–2008), American football player
 Donovan Jeter (born 1998), American football player
 Gary Jeter (1955–2016), American football player
 Tony Jeter (born 1944), American football player

Other
 Carmelita Jeter (born 1979), American sprinter
 Johnny Jeter (born 1981), American professional wrestler

Other
 Chris Jeter, American attorney and politician in Indiana
 Claude Jeter (1914–2009), American gospel singer
 Henry N. Jeter (1851–1938), American Baptist minister
 Howard Jeter (born 1947), retired American diplomat
 James Jeter (1921–2007), American film, stage and television actor
 K. W. Jeter (born 1950), American author
 Michael Jeter (1952–2003), American actor
 William T. Jeter (1850–1930), American politician, 21st Lieutenant Governor of California

Fictional characters
 Tom Jeter, fictional character on Studio 60 on the Sunset Strip

See also
 Jeder, Hungarian name of a village in Romania
 Jeter Downs (born 1998), Colombian-American baseball player
 Jever, a city in Lower Saxony, Germany
 Jever Brewery, located in Jever